Krishna Bhusan Bal (13 March 1948 - 25 June 2012) was a Nepalese poet known primarily for simplifying poetry for its readers at a time when poets were inclined to grandiloquence. Carving emotions into words is considered to be one of Bal’s most intricate qualities. Bal’s personality is often compared to a poem, indifferent to race, caste, religion, and politics.

Biography

Early life
Bal was born on 13 March 1948 at his maternal home to Hem Bal Tamang and Sharda Ghising Tamang. He was the eldest, having two sisters born after him. His father remarried after the death of his mother. Though his sisters stayed with their father, he stayed at his late mother’s house as Tikaram Tamang until his graduation from elementary school. 

Tikaram, although considered to be an average student by his teacher, Lagna Prasad, showed great interest in literature and extra-curricular activities. After completing his basic level education from Rabi Campus and Durga Higher Secondary School, Tikaram was schooled at Karfok Vidya Mandir by Nar Bahadur Lama. Later, Tikaram moved to Ilam Bazar, where he worked as the chief of the committee. There, he started writing and publishing poems with the name of Krishna Bhusan Bal.

Education and career
Having finished his basic level education from Ravi Bazar, Ilam, Tamang moved to Biratnagar. In the process of becoming Krishna Bhusan, Tikaram passed his SLC from Kathmandu, where he aspired to become a policeman. However, upon suggestions from some friends, he passed the Public Service Commission examinations and enrolled to get his Bachelor of Arts degree while working at Nepal Rastra Bank. Later, he started writing and publishing poems under the name of Krishna Bhusan Bal, which he considered to be his road to fame.

Literature

Tikaram moved to Ilam Bazar, where he worked as the chief of the committee. There, he started writing and publishing poems with the name of Krishna Bhusan Bal. His first poem, Ma Yuvak Hoon, was published in the Saugat daily based in Ilam.

Bal had to bear torture from his father and his stepmother after his mother died when he was barely 5; thereby, adding to his struggles. At the age of 17, Bhushan moved to Kathmandu. Three years later, he moved to Biratnagar where he stayed for the rest of his life.

The publishing of Sadak Kavita Kranti in 1979 and  Bholi Baasne Bihana in 1984 established his status as a revolutionary poet of the Nepali language. Bal, along with Gopal Prasad Rimal and Bairagi Kainla, was considered to be one of the most revolutionary Nepalese poets by renowned critic Krishna Chandra Singh Pradhan.

Bal’s Bisaun Bhanau Sakdina, published on 23 June 2012, is considered to be his last work.

Personal life
Bal fathered a son and a daughter with his wife, Shobha Lama, whom he met when he worked at Nepal Rastra Bank.

Death
Bal was taken to the hospital when he was found unconscious in the shower after going for a morning walk. Bal, who was discharged from Neuro Hospital, Biratnagar just four days before the incident, was pronounced dead due to intracerebral hemorrhage on June 25, 2012 at 7:25 pm.

Styles and themes
Krishna Bhusan Bal is known for presenting current events and different stages of life in simple yet euphonious words. Reality and contemporaneity are included in the list of strengths of his poems. 

Bal’s career, which started in the seventies, spanned a little over three decades. Amiable and compassionate Bal’s works, Dajyu, Timro Haat Chahinchha and Bholi Baasne Bihana, have been acclaimed critically by literary critics and writers alike. Many litterateurs have drawn inspiration from Bal and claimed that he will be remembered for generations to come. He has, in fact, been compared to Langston Hughes and Martin Luther King Jr. by SAARC Literary Award winner Suman Pokhrel.

Published works

Poetry collections

Epics

Writings

Awards and honours
Bal, whose poems were first published in Sangalo, edited by litterateur Madhav Bhandari, continued writing till much later in life. For his indispensable contributions to Nepali poetry, Bal has received several awards and honours.

Affiliated organizations

See also
List of Nepalese poets

References

External links
 Parajuli, Gopal. Prasiddha Kavi Krishna Bhusan Bal.
 Gautam, Dhruba Chandra. Krishna Bhusan Bal. Drishti Saptahik.
 Krishna Bhusan Bal ka Charchit Kavita. Sahitya Vatika.
 Ek Door Vigat: Kavi Krishna Bhusan Bal Sanga. Samakalin Sahitya - Nepali Sahitya ko Sangraha.
 Rai, Rajesh. "Kavita ko Byaj Khayera Bachirahechhu" - Krishna Bhusan Bal. Saurya Dainik.
 Krishna Bhusan Bal. Nepali Lekhak Haru ko Vaiyaktik Vivaran Pustakalaya.
 Rahenan Krishna Bhusan Bal. Our Biratnagar.
 Desh ko Bhusan Thiyo Kavi Krishna Bhusan. Nagarik.
 Ek Door Vigat: Kavi Krishna Bhusan Bal sanga ko. Panch Vismrit.
 Timilsina, Ramji. Bhusan Dai sangai Rokiyeko Lahar. Pustak Sansar.
 Bharosa Lagda Kavi ko Avsaan. Eadarsha.com.
 Pragya Krishna Bhusan Bal - Pahilo Bhet, Ek Samjhana. Jijibisha: Jeevan ma Tarangit Bhogai ra Aabhas ka Chhaal Haru!!
 Bhattarai, Jaydev. Sashakta Kavi ko Avsaan. Gorkhapatra Shanibar.
 Krishna Bhushan Bal. Tamang Samaj.
 Swargiya Kavi Krishna Bhusan Bal ko Shraddhanjali Sabha America ko California ma. Online Sahityik Patrika - Vividh Vishay Haru ko Sangalo.
 Thamsuhang, Prakash. Bal Dai, Yatri ra Kathmandu. Bagaicha.
 Bhattarai, Govinda Raj. Euta Aglo Prakash-Stambh Dhale pachhi ko Andhakar muni Basera Aaja Ma.

Nepalese male poets
1948 births
2012 deaths
20th-century Nepalese poets
21st-century Nepalese poets
People from Ilam District